The 2020 Championnat de France FFSA GT - GT4 France season is the twenty-third season of the French FFSA GT Championship and the third as the French GT4 Cup, a sports car championship created and organised by the Stéphane Ratel Organisation (SRO). The season began on 21 August in Nogaro and ends on 8 November at Lédenon.

Calendar 
A 2020 calendar was announced on 29 July 2019 at SRO's annual press conference at the 2019 24 Hours of Spa. However, as a result of the coronavirus crisis SRO had to revise its schedule and an updated calendar was released on 13 May 2020. The season finale at Circuit de Lédenon on 6–8 November was cancelled due to the restrictions caused by COVID-19 pandemic in France and replaced by the competition at Circuit Paul Ricard on 20–22 November.

Entry list

Race results 			
Bold indicates overall winner.

Championship standings 			

 Scoring system

Championship points were awarded for the first ten positions in each race. Entries were required to complete 75% of the winning car's race distance in order to be classified and earn points. Individual drivers were required to participate for a minimum of 25 minutes in order to earn championship points in any race.

Drivers' championship

Teams' championship

See also 			

 2020 GT4 European Series
 2020 ADAC GT4 Germany

Notes

References

External links 			

 
			

			
GT4 European Series			
French GT4 Cup